Edinburgh Cathedral may refer to:

 St Giles' Cathedral, Edinburgh (Church of Scotland)
 St Mary's Cathedral, Edinburgh (Episcopal)
 St Mary's Cathedral, Edinburgh (Roman Catholic)